Jean-Luc Bilodeau (born November 4, 1990) is a Canadian actor who has been acting since 2004. He is best known for his role as Ben Wheeler in the ABC Family channel program Baby Daddy.
Bilodeau has also appeared in films and television series such as Ill Fated, Trick 'r Treat, 16 Wishes, Kyle XY, No Ordinary Family and Best Player. He was also in Emmalyn Estrada's music video "Don't Make Me Let You Go" and plays Jeremy in the movie LOL.

Early life
Bilodeau is the son of Raymond and Barbara Bilodeau, and has a sister, Danielle Bilodeau, who is a talent agent in Vancouver, British Columbia. Before becoming an actor, he was a dancer for nine years but dropped dancing because of his busy film schedule. He is of French Canadian descent.

Career
Jean-Luc Bilodeau appeared as the protagonist's best friend Jay in the Disney Channel Original movie 16 Wishes, starring Debby Ryan, and as Ash alongside Jennette McCurdy and Jerry Trainor in the Nickelodeon Original movie Best Player. He was then a series regular in Kyle XY as Josh Trager for all three seasons on ABC Family. He played the lead role of Ben on the successful ABC Family series Baby Daddy co-starring Tahj Mowry, which aired its series finale in May 2017. He also played a small supporting role in the coming-of-age film LOL which starred Miley Cyrus. He currently stars in Carol's Second Act on CBS.

Filmography

References

External links
 

1990 births
Living people
21st-century Canadian male actors
Canadian male child actors
Canadian male film actors
Canadian male television actors
Canadian male voice actors
Canadian people of French descent
Franco-Columbian people
Male actors from Vancouver